Chhalia is a 1973 Hindi-language Indian feature film directed by Mukul Dutt and starring Navin Nischol, Nanda, Shatrughan Sinha, Rajendra Nath and Helen. The film was amongst the last films of actress Nanda in lead roles in 1970s when she had reduced her work after starring in several film from 1950s.

Plot
Chhalia is a family thriller.

Music
"Pyaar Bechti Hoon" - Asha Bhosle
"O Jaaneman" - Asha Bhosle, Kishore Kumar
"Pyaar To Hai Ek Baazi" - Asha Bhosle
"Zindagi Men Aap Aaye" - Vani Jairam, Mukesh
"A janewafa aisa bhi kaya" - Mohammed Rafi

Cast
 Navin Nischol
 Nanda
 Shatrughan Sinha
 Rajendra Nath
 Asrani
 Helen
 Bhagwan Dada

References

External links
 

1973 films
1970s Hindi-language films
Films scored by R. D. Burman